John Jeffreys Pratt, 1st Marquess Camden,  (11 February 17598 October 1840), styled Viscount Bayham from 1786 to 1794 and known as The 2nd Earl Camden from 1794 to 1812, was a British politician. He served as Lord Lieutenant of Ireland in the revolutionary years 1795 to 1798 and as Secretary of State for War and the Colonies between 1804 and 1805.

Background and education
John Jeffreys Pratt was born at Lincoln's Inn Fields, London, the only son of the barrister Charles Pratt, KC (a son of Sir John Pratt, a former Lord Chief Justice of the King's Bench), and Elizabeth, daughter of Nicholas Jeffreys, of The Priory, Brecknockshire. He was baptised on the day Halley's Comet appeared. In 1765, his father (by then Sir Charles Pratt, having been appointed Chief Justice of the Common Pleas in 1762) was created Baron Camden, at which point he became The Hon. John Pratt. He was educated at the University of Cambridge (Trinity College).

Political career
In 1780, Pratt was elected Member of Parliament for Bath and obtained the position of Teller of the Exchequer the same year, a lucrative office which he kept until his death, although after 1812 he refused to receive the large income arising from it. He served under Lord Shelburne as Lord of the Admiralty between 1782 and 1783 and in the same post under William Pitt the Younger between 1783 and 1789, as well as a Lord of the Treasury between 1789 and 1792.

In 1786, his father was created Earl Camden, at which point he became known by one of his father's subsidiary titles as Viscount Bayham.

In 1793, Bayham was sworn of the Privy Council. In 1794 he succeeded his father as 2nd Earl Camden, and the following year he was appointed Lord Lieutenant of Ireland by Pitt.

Disliked in Ireland as an opponent of Roman Catholic emancipation and as the exponent of an unpopular policy, Camden's term of office was one of turbulence, culminating in the rebellion of 1798; his refusal in 1797 to reprieve the United Irishman William Orr, convicted of treason on the word of one witness of dubious credit (and for which his own sister Frances, Lady Londonderry, petitioned him), aroused great public indignation. To break the United Irish conspiracy, he suspended habeas corpus and unlashed a ruthless martial-law campaign to disarm and break up the republican organization.

Immediately after the suppression of the rising Camden resigned. In 1804 he became Secretary of State for War and the Colonies under Pitt, and in 1805 Lord President of the Council, an office he retained until 1806. He was again Lord President from 1807 to 1812, after which date he remained for some time in the cabinet without office. In 1812 he was created Earl of Brecknock and Marquess Camden.

The enforced resignation from the Cabinet of Lord Castlereagh, the stepson of his sister Frances (Lady Londonderry), to whom he had always been personally close, in September 1809, led to a series of bitter family quarrels, when it became clear that Camden had known for months of the plan to dismiss Castlereagh, but had given him no warning. Castlereagh himself regarded Camden as "a weak friend", not an enemy, and they were eventually reconciled. Other members of the Stewart family, however, never forgave Camden for what they regarded as his disloyalty.

Camden was also Lord Lieutenant of Kent between 1808 and 1840 and appointed himself Colonel of the Cranbrook and Woodsgate Regiment of Local Militia in 1809. He was Chancellor of Cambridge University between 1834 and 1840. He was made a Knight of the Garter in 1799 and elected a Fellow of the Society of Antiquaries of London in 1802.

Family
Lord Camden married Frances, daughter of William Molesworth, in 1785. She died at Bayham Abbey, Sussex, in July 1829. Lord Camden survived her by eleven years and died at Seale, Surrey, on 8 October 1840, aged 81. He was succeeded by his only son, George.

The family owned and lived in a house located at 22 Arlington Street in St. James's, a district of the City of Westminster in central London, which is adjoining the Ritz Hotel. In the year of his death, he sold the house to The 7th Duke of Beaufort.

References

External links

|-

|-

British Secretaries of State
Chancellors of the University of Cambridge
Knights of the Garter
Lord-Lieutenants of Kent
Kent Militia officers
Lord Presidents of the Council
Lords Lieutenant of Ireland
Pratt, John Jeffreys, 1st Marquess Camden
Members of the Privy Council of Ireland
Pratt, John Jeffreys
People of the Irish Rebellion of 1798
1759 births
1840 deaths
John
1